"Black Eyed Boy" is the third single from Scottish rock band Texas's fourth studio album, White on Blonde (1997). The song was released on 28 July 1997 and reached number five on the UK Singles Chart. Elsewhere, the song reached the top 50 in Australia, Belgium, France, Ireland, Israel and Sweden.

Critical reception
A reviewer from Music Week rated the song four out of five, noting that "Texas immerse themselves in Motown on this thumpingly catchy Supremes-sounding groove, conjuring up a perfect summer gift for radio." A few weeks later, it was given five out of five and picked as Single of the Week. The magazine stated that "Sharleen plays Diana Ross on the stand-out track from White On Blonde, its Motownalike euphoria pumped up even further in this single version. Will send the album shooting back up the chart." David Sinclair from The Times wrote in his review of White on Blonde, that "Black Eyed Boy" is "little more than the Supremes-by-numbers."

Music video
The accompanying music video for "Black Eyed Boy", directed by Karen Lamond, is filmed in black-and-white and features the band performing the song whilst a man is shown running. At the end of the video, the man arrives in a tunnel which has many large pictures of Sharleen Spiteri on each side. The pictures then burst into flames and the man runs down the tunnel.

Track listings
 UK CD single 
 "Black Eyed Boy" (Summer Mix) – 3:16
 "Sorry" – 4:33
 "Black Eyed Disco" – 4:20
 "Say What You Want" (Acoustic Mary Ann Hobbs Session) – 3:50

 UK limited-edition CD single—includes poster 
 "Black Eyed Boy" (Summer Mix radio) – 3:16
 "Black Eyed Boy" (Trailermen's Black Eyed Disco) – 8:45
 "Black Eyed Boy" (Trailermen's Disco Boy Dub) – 7:40
 "Black Eyed Boy" (Neo-Northern Bossa Nova) – 4:53
 "Black Eyed Boy" (Stoppa & Nobby's Madeye) – 6:23
 "Black Eyed Boy" (album version) – 3:10

 European CD single 
 "Black Eyed Boy" (Summer Mix) – 3:16
 "Fameless" – 4:21

Personnel
Personnel are lifted from The Greatest Hits album booklet.
 Texas – production
 Johnny McElhone – writing, keyboards, programming, additional production and mix (as Johnny Mac)
 Sharleen Spiteri – writing, backing vocals, guitars, programming
 Ally McErlaine – guitars
 Eddie Campbell – writing, backing vocals, keyboards, programming
 Richard Hynd – writing, drums, programming
 Robert Hodgens – writing, backing vocals
 Kenny MacDonald – mix engineering

Charts

Weekly charts

Year-end charts

References

1997 singles
1997 songs
Mercury Records singles
Songs written by Johnny McElhone
Songs written by Sharleen Spiteri
Texas (band) songs